The World Triathlon Cross Duathlon Championships is a premier cross duathlon championship competition organised by World Triathlon. The first event took place in 2022 as part of the 2022 ITU Multisport World Championship and consisted of a 7km trail run, followed by a 23.2km mountain bike cross-country race and finishing with 3.5km of trail running.

Medallists

Men's championship

Women's championship

References

 
 

Duathlon, Cross
Recurring sporting events established in 2022
Triathlon world championships